Johnny Francisco Araya Monge (born 29 April 1957) is a Costa Rican politician. He was the mayor of the country's capital San José from 1998 to 2001 and again since 2003. He was also the co-president of the United Cities and Local Governments (UCLG) from 2010 to 2013. He is a member of the National Liberation Party (PLN) and was presidential candidate in the 2014 election.

Early life
Johnny Araya was born in 1957. He is the nephew of Luis Alberto Monge, who was President of Costa Rica from 1982 to 1986. Araya graduated from the University of Costa Rica's Faculty of Agronomy in 1980.

Career
Araya worked as an agronomic engineer for many years. Elected councilor of the City of San José for the first time in 1982, he participated in the Harvard Institute for International Development's one-month program for mayors of Latin America and the Caribbean in 1992.

Mayor and international organizations official 
He was mayor of the city between 1998 and 2001 and since 2003. He is also holding several other political posts: he is Member of the National Assembly, the National Policy Board, the San José Provincial Assembly and the San José Canton Assembly.

He was: Vice-president of the Union of Ibero-American Capital Cities (UCCI), representing the region of Central America, Mexico and the Caribbean from 1996 to 2000 and from 2004 to 2006; President-delegate and member of the Bureau of the World Federation of United Cities (FMCU); Vice-president of the executive committee of the UCCI from 2004 to 2006; Co-president of the UCCI from 2006 to 2008 and again vice-president from 2010 to 2012.

Inside the UCLG, Johnny Araya was a member of the executive committee of its Latin American regional section, the Latin American Federation of Cities, Municipalities and Associations of Local Governments (FLACMA) from 2004 to 2006; member of the World Council of UCLG from 2004 to 2007; FLACMA Co-president from 2006 to 2012; and finally UCLG Co-president for the 2010–2013 term.

Presidential candidacy 
On 31 January 2013 the PLN nominated him as its presidential candidate to succeed his incumbent party colleague, President Laura Chinchilla, constitutionally barred from re-election.

Favored to win, Araya's campaign staff "guaranteed a triumph in the first round",  but Araya came in second place to Luis Guillermo Solís, who won 30.9% of the vote against Araya's 29.6%. Araya's support was limited to the rural provinces of Guanacaste, Puntarenas and Limón, where the PLN maintains a strong party support system.

On 6 March 2014 Araya announced that he would abandon his presidential campaign after polls showed him far behind Luis Guillermo Solís.

MECO Travel Incident

Five days after being chosen as the PLN presidential candidate, Araya flew in a private jet owned by MECO Construction, a firm that was awarded contracts worth US65 million by the former presidential administrations of Laura Chinchilla and Óscar Arias, both PLN members.  Araya attended a FIFA World Cup qualifying match in Panama with his campaign manager and the CEO of MECO Construction, who had previously made donations to Chinchilla's campaign. After returning to Costa Rica, Araya denied traveling on a private jet or traveling with MECO Construction's CEO.

The owner of the jet, a private business owner, said that Araya had taken several trips on the jet previously. Such trips are in violation of Article 128 of the Supreme Electoral Tribunal of Costa Rica, which prohibits donations from private companies.

Araya was arrested as part of Operation Diamond on 15 November 2021 for alleged corruption.

Notes

References

External links
Johnny Araya Official Web Site

|-

|-

|-

1957 births
Living people
People from Palmares (canton)
National Liberation Party (Costa Rica) politicians
Mayors of places in Costa Rica